Andrea Cole is a Canadian former Paralympic swimmer. She competed as a member of Team Canada at the 2000 Summer Paralympics, 2004 Summer Paralympics, and 2008 Summer Paralympics. She set a Canadian record in the women's SM8 200-m individual medley in 2002 with a time of 3:03.04, which was beaten in 2016.

Early life
Cole was born and raised in Thunder Bay, Ontario. She began swimming after her mother read an article about a Paralympic swimmer.

Career
Cole was selected to compete with Team Canada's National Swimming Team during the 2000 Summer Paralympics. In 2002, Cole set a new Canadian women's record for fastest SM8 200-m individual medley with a time of 3:03.04. This record was later beaten in 2016 by Abi Tripp. Cole was named to Team Canada's National Swimming Team for the 2004 Summer Paralympics where she won a silver medal in the 4X100m freestyle relay and bronze in the 100m butterfly. As a result, she was named a co-recipient of the 2005 Janet Dunn Award from the Canadian Cerebral Palsy Sport Association.

In 2007, Cole qualified for the Parapan American Games with a time of one minute, 26.32 seconds in the 100-metre butterfly. During the 2007 Parapan American Games, she won two gold medals while competing in the women's S8 disability category 100-freestyle and 100 backstroke. The next year, she was selected to compete at the 2008 Summer Paralympics in the  S8 200m IM.

In 2013, Cole was inducted into the Northwestern Ontario Sports Hall of Fame.

References

External links
 

Living people
Sportspeople from Thunder Bay
Swimmers with cerebral palsy
Paralympic silver medalists for Canada
Cerebral Palsy category Paralympic competitors
University of Western Ontario alumni
Year of birth missing (living people)
Paralympic medalists in swimming
Medalists at the 2004 Summer Paralympics
Swimmers at the 2000 Summer Paralympics
Swimmers at the 2004 Summer Paralympics
Swimmers at the 2008 Summer Paralympics
Paralympic swimmers of Canada
Medalists at the 2007 Parapan American Games
Canadian female freestyle swimmers
Canadian female backstroke swimmers
Canadian female medley swimmers
S8-classified Paralympic swimmers